The 2007 NBA playoffs was the postseason tournament of the National Basketball Association's 2006–07 season. The tournament concluded with the Western Conference champion San Antonio Spurs defeating the Eastern Conference champion Cleveland Cavaliers 4 games to 0 in the NBA Finals. Tony Parker was named NBA Finals MVP, making him the first Spur other than Tim Duncan and the first European-born player to receive the award.

Overview
The Dallas Mavericks entered the playoffs with a 67-15 regular season record, the NBA’s best record and the best in franchise history. They also became the first team since 2000 to finish the regular season with 65+ wins.

For the second straight season, a division winner opened the playoffs on the road. In this case, Southeast Division winner Miami Heat and Northwest Division winner Utah Jazz each opened their postseasons against the fifth seeded Chicago Bulls and Houston Rockets, respectively, despite not having home court advantage.

The Golden State Warriors made the NBA Playoffs for the first time since 1994 NBA playoffs.

The Indiana Pacers missed the playoffs for the first time since 1997, while the Sacramento Kings missed the playoffs for the first time since 1998.

The Toronto Raptors made the playoffs for the first time since 2002 and earned home-court advantage for the first time in franchise history. However, they lost to the New Jersey Nets in six games.

The Orlando Magic made the playoffs for the first time since 2003. However, they were swept by the Detroit Pistons in the first round. The Utah Jazz also made the playoffs for the first time since 2003.

With their first round sweep of the defending champion Miami Heat, the Chicago Bulls won their first playoff series since 1998. This was also Pat Riley’s final NBA playoff appearance as a head coach, as the Heat would miss the playoffs the following season. With the loss, the Heat also became the first defending champion in 50 seasons to be swept in the first round.

With their shocking first round upset over the Dallas Mavericks, The Golden State Warriors became the third eighth seed to beat a top seed (the first time to do so since the first round was extended to a best of seven in 2003) and the first team to accomplish this feat since the 1999 New York Knicks’ Cinderella run to the Finals. With the loss, the Dallas Mavericks earned the dubious distinction of becoming the first (and currently only) .800 regular season team to lose in the first round. With the win, the Golden State Warriors also won their first playoff series since 1991.

With their first round series losses, the Miami Heat and Dallas Mavericks became the first NBA Finals pair to lose in the first round in the following year’s playoffs. They also share the dubious distinction of being the second and third top seeds, respectively, to lose to an eighth seed in the first round in the NBA Playoffs.

The Jazz-Rockets series marked the eighth straight postseason in which at least one Game 7 was played. In addition, it was the sole Game 7 of this year’s playoffs.

With their Game 7 win over the Houston Rockets, the Utah Jazz their first playoff series since 2000.

With their conference semifinals win against the New Jersey Nets, the Cleveland Cavaliers made their first Conference Finals appearance since 1992. Game 6 of the Cavaliers-Nets series was the final NBA Playoff game ever played in New Jersey, as well as the last NBA Playoff game ever played at Continental Airlines Arena. The Nets would not return to the playoffs until 2013 as the Brooklyn Nets.

With their conference semifinals win over the Golden State Warriors, the Utah Jazz made the conference finals for the first time since 1998 (when they last made the NBA Finals).

Despite trailing 2-0 to the Detroit Pistons in the Eastern Conference Finals, the Cleveland Cavaliers won the series in six games to make their first ever NBA Finals appearance.

The San Antonio Spurs won the 2007 NBA Finals with a four game sweep of the Cleveland Cavaliers, the first finals sweep since 2002. The Spurs and Cavaliers would not return to the finals until 2013 and 2015, respectively.

Seeding

The playoffs are conducted in 4 rounds of best-of-7 series. The 3 division winners in each conference, along with the 5 best non-division winners in each conference, qualify for the playoffs. The division winners and top second-place team are seeded 1–4 based on record, with the remaining teams seeded 5–8 on record.

Up until 2006, the division champions were guaranteed no worse than the third seed, while the non-division winners could do no better than the fourth seed regardless of record. This was the source of controversy in the 2006 NBA playoffs, when the 63-win Spurs and 60-win Dallas Mavericks—the teams with the second-best and third-best records in the entire league—met in the conference semifinals. In response, the NBA changed the seeding system so that the teams with the two best records in the conference are guaranteed the top two seeds even if the second-best team isn't a division champion. Meanwhile, the division champions are guaranteed no worse than the fourth seed. This ensures that the teams with the two best records in the conference cannot meet until the conference finals at the earliest.

Playoff qualifying

Eastern Conference
The following teams clinched a playoff berth in the East:
Detroit Pistons (53-29, clinched Central division)
Cleveland Cavaliers (50-32, best record in the conference outside the division winners)
Toronto Raptors (47-35, clinched Atlantic division)
Miami Heat (44-38, clinched Southeast division)
Chicago Bulls (49-33)
 New Jersey Nets (41-41)
Washington Wizards (41-41)
Orlando Magic (40-42)

Western Conference
The following teams clinched a playoff berth in the West:
Dallas Mavericks (67-15, clinched Southwest division and home-court advantage throughout playoffs)
Phoenix Suns (61-21, clinched Pacific division)
San Antonio Spurs (58-24, best record in the conference outside the division winners)
Utah Jazz (51-31, clinched Northwest division)
Houston Rockets (52-30)
Denver Nuggets (45-37)
Los Angeles Lakers (42-40)
Golden State Warriors (42-40)

Bracket
This is the outlook for the 2007 NBA Playoffs. Teams in italics have home court advantage. Teams in bold advance to the next round. Numbers to the left of each team indicate the team's original playoffs seeding in their respective conferences. Numbers to the right of each team indicate the number of games the team won in that round. The division champions possess an asterisk (*)

Notes
Houston and Chicago had home court advantage in the first round despite being lower seeds. Both teams had better regular season records than their opponents, but did not have the best record of the non-division-champion playoff teams in their respective conferences.

First round

Eastern Conference first round

(1) Detroit Pistons vs. (8) Orlando Magic 

This was the third playoff meeting between these two teams, with each team winning one series apiece.

The Orlando Magic's first playoff trip in 4 seasons was short lived as the top ranked Detroit Pistons dispatched the upstart Magic in 4 games. The Pistons recorded their first series sweep since sweeping Indiana in the first round of the 1990 NBA playoffs. The series was also the first time Orlando forward Grant Hill had appeared in the postseason since leaving Detroit after the 2000 season.

(2) Cleveland Cavaliers vs. (7) Washington Wizards 

This was the fourth playoff meeting between these two teams, with the Cavaliers winning two of the first three meetings.

A rematch of the previous year's first round series was spoiled when Wizards stars Gilbert Arenas and Caron Butler were both forced out of the playoffs due to injuries received in the later parts of the regular season. Without Arenas and Butler, the Wizards were unable to stop LeBron James and the Cleveland Cavaliers from sweeping them out of the playoffs. It was Cleveland's first playoff sweep in franchise history.

(3) Toronto Raptors vs. (6) New Jersey Nets 

This was the first playoff meeting between the Nets and the Raptors.

The Nets won the first round of the 2007 NBA Playoffs in their sixth straight appearance in the NBA Playoffs. The series was the only one in the Eastern Conference first round not to result in a sweep.

The series was notable for pitting ex-Raptor Vince Carter, who was traded to the Nets in 2004 after an acrimonious split, against his former team. So great was the Toronto crowd's disdain for Carter, that he was booed every time he touched the ball. The Nets took home court advantage in Game 1, holding off a late Raptors rally in the fourth quarter. The Raptors pulled away in Game 2 and tied the series at 1. When the series shifted to New Jersey, the Nets took charge of the series, winning Games 3 and 4 in routs. New Jersey had a chance to win the series in Game 5 in Toronto, but the Raptors took a 20-point lead after one quarter. Still, New Jersey managed to chip away, and had a chance to win it, but Boštjan Nachbar's 3 missed at the buzzer. Needing to win in New Jersey to force a Game 7, Toronto held a one-point lead with under a minute to play in Game 6, but Richard Jefferson hit a layup with 8 seconds left. Toronto attempted to try for the game-winning shot, but Jefferson intercepted the pass to seal the series for the Nets.

(4) Miami Heat vs. (5) Chicago Bulls 

Game 4 is Gary Payton's final NBA game.

This was the fifth playoff meeting between these two teams, with the Bulls winning three of the first four meetings.

The Bulls won their first playoff series since the 1998 NBA Finals and the retirement of Michael Jordan. This was the Bulls first 4-game sweep, since sweeping the Magic in the 1996 Eastern Conference Finals. Meanwhile, Miami became the first defending champion since 1957 to be swept in the First Round the following season.

In addition, Southeast Division champions Miami and other division qualifiers Washington and Orlando were swept (0–12) by Chicago, Cleveland, Detroit respectively, all from the Central Division (12–0).

Western Conference first round

(1) Dallas Mavericks vs. (8) Golden State Warriors 

This was the first playoff meeting between the Mavericks and the Warriors.

The Warriors qualified for the playoffs for the first time since 1994, the second longest such streak in league history. However, the Warriors were heavy underdogs against the Dallas Mavericks despite sweeping the regular season series between the teams, as Dallas had one of the best records in NBA regular season history. Expectations of a short series were immediately dashed by Golden State's Game 1 victory in Dallas, behind guard Baron Davis and his rather frantic style of play. The Mavericks came back to win Game 2 to tie the series at 1.

But when the series shifted to Oakland for the next two games, a new X-factor emerged for the Warriors: their home crowd at the Oracle Arena. The electric crowd, which was the highest paid attendance crowd for an NBA game in the history of that arena, gave the Warriors a huge lift as they blew out Dallas in Game 3, and edged out a close victory in Game 4. As the series shifted back to Dallas, the top-ranked Mavericks found themselves one game from seeing their record breaking season end prematurely. The Mavericks gave their all and staved off elimination in Game 5, but had nothing left in Game 6 in Oakland. The Warriors used a third-quarter 18–0 run, sparked by Stephen Jackson's 13 straight points en route to a franchise playoff record seven 3-pointers, and an unexpected collapse from MVP candidate Dirk Nowitzki (2–13 from the field with 8 points) to finish Dallas and become the first #8 seed to win a best-of-7 series in the first round, and just the third overall in NBA history, following the Denver Nuggets in 1994 and the New York Knicks en route to the 1999 NBA Finals. The Warriors also won their first playoff series since 1991. The Mavericks also became the second team who had a 65+ winning record not to win a championship, the first being the 1972–73 Boston Celtics, and the most recently, the 2017-18 Houston Rockets. To date, they are the only ones who were eliminated in the first round.

Both 2006 NBA Finalists (Dallas and Miami) were eliminated in the first round despite being top 4 seeds. This was the first time since 1957 that this had happened. This would not happen again until 2021 when the NBA Finalists from the previous season (L.A. Lakers and Miami Heat) were eliminated in the first round as lower-seeded teams.

(2) Phoenix Suns vs. (7) Los Angeles Lakers 

This was the 11th playoff meeting between these two teams, with the Lakers winning seven of the first ten meetings.

Kobe Bryant and the Lakers went up against the high powered Phoenix Suns in a rematch of the previous year's first round series, which saw the Lakers take a 3–1 lead before the Suns took the series in 7. Unlike the previous series, the Suns had near complete control of the series, taking the series in 5. The Suns advanced to their third straight conference semifinals by eliminating the Lakers in the first round for the second straight year. In Game 4, Phoenix point guard Steve Nash made a run at the record for most assists in a playoff game, finishing one shy of the record 24 shared by Magic Johnson and John Stockton.

(3) San Antonio Spurs vs. (6) Denver Nuggets 

This was the sixth playoff meeting between these two teams, with the Spurs winning four of the first five meetings.

The Nuggets duo of Carmelo Anthony and Allen Iverson got Denver off to a fast start, winning Game 1 and taking home-court advantage away from Tim Duncan and the Spurs. Despite the early letdown, the Spurs showed their championship mettle and bounced back for a 97–88 win in Game 2. In the pivotal Game 3, the Nuggets built an eight-point first-quarter lead before Manu Ginóbili's eight second-quarter points put San Antonio up 43–40 at halftime. A back-and-forth contest turned in the final 2:24 of the third quarter: Michael Finley hit two 3-pointers, and Robert Horry later hit a 3 that gave the Spurs a 75–67 lead at the end of the quarter. They hung on for a 96–91 win.

Denver started strong again in Game 4 and led by eight at halftime. But San Antonio stormed back after Anthony went to the bench in the third quarter with his fourth foul. The Spurs held a one-point lead with 30 seconds left when Horry, playing for his seventh championship ring, hit a 3 from the right corner to help seal a 96–89 win. The stunned Nuggets did not recover from the Game 4 letdown. Finley was the hero in Game 5, hitting a team-playoff-record eight threes for 26 points as San Antonio won 93–78 to end the series, marking the Nuggets' fourth straight season where they lost in the first round in five games. This is the second time in three seasons that the Nuggets lost the first-round series to the Spurs, after taking Game 1 in San Antonio (the first also happened in five games).

(4) Utah Jazz vs. (5) Houston Rockets 

This was the sixth playoff meeting between these two teams, with the Jazz winning three of the first five meetings.

The resurgent Utah Jazz, fresh off one of their best seasons since the John Stockton/Karl Malone years, faced Yao Ming, Tracy McGrady and the Houston Rockets, who were seeking their first playoff series victory in 10 years. Home court advantage proved to be the key as the series progressed, as both the Rockets and the Jazz won closely contested matches in front of their home crowds.

As a result, the series had to go to a seventh and deciding game, which was played in Houston since the Rockets had the better record and thereby earned home court advantage, despite the division-winning Jazz being the higher-seeded team. Nevertheless, Utah overcame the Houston crowd and stunned the Rockets for the win on the road. The Jazz became only the third road team in history to win Game 7 of a seven-game series in which the home team won each of the first six games, after the Boston Celtics in the 1969 NBA Finals and the Baltimore Bullets in the 1971 Eastern Conference Finals. Houston's Tracy McGrady lost his sixth straight post-season series (out of 10 seasons) and has never played past the first round in his entire career.

After losing the series, the Rockets failed to reach a new contract agreement with their head coach Jeff Van Gundy, who was subsequently fired.

Conference semifinals

Eastern Conference semifinals

(1) Detroit Pistons vs. (5) Chicago Bulls 

This was the sixth playoff meeting between these two teams, with the Pistons winning three of the first five meetings.

In a renewal of a rivalry from the late '80s and early '90s, the Chicago Bulls and the Detroit Pistons faced off against each other. This was also the first time since 1995 that teams from the two cities met in a major league postseason or game. The series began fairly one-sided as the Pistons took Games 1 and 2 in Detroit in blowout fashion, followed by another convincing victory in Game 3 in Chicago. In all 3 games, the Bulls looked severely outmatched against the more experienced Pistons squad. Expectations were low for the Bulls, since no NBA team has ever won a seven-game series after being down 3–0. (It has only happened five times total in sports history, the 1942 Toronto Maple Leafs, 1975 New York Islanders, 2004 Boston Red Sox, 2010 Philadelphia Flyers and 2014 Los Angeles Kings.)

Despite the huge obstacle, the Bulls rallied to take Game 4 in a romp, and then proceeded to shock everyone with a blow-out victory in Detroit in Game 5. Despite the renewed momentum, the Pistons' playoff experience ultimately won out as they closed out the Bulls in a 95-85 Game 6 win. The Pistons advanced to the Eastern Conference Finals for the fifth straight year.

(2) Cleveland Cavaliers vs. (6) New Jersey Nets

This was the third playoff meeting between these two teams, with the Cavaliers winning the first two meetings.

The Cavaliers advanced to the Eastern Conference Finals for the first time since 1992, while the Nets lost in the Conference Semifinals in three out of the last four years. Game 6 was the final playoff game at the Continental Airlines Arena, while also the last NBA playoff game ever played in New Jersey (the Prudential Center never hosted an NBA playoff game during the Nets' tenure from 2010 to 2012).

 New Jersey Nets point guard Jason Kidd averaged a triple double the entire playoffs, scoring 14.6 points, grabbing 10.9 rebounds and dishing out 10.9 assists per game.

Western Conference semifinals

(2) Phoenix Suns vs. (3) San Antonio Spurs 

This was the eighth playoff meeting between these two teams, with the Spurs winning four of the first seven meetings.

The highly anticipated match-up between the high-powered Phoenix Suns, led by 2-time MVP Steve Nash, and the fundamentally sound San Antonio Spurs, led by 3-time Finals MVP Tim Duncan, had high expectations before the series tip-off. The Suns were looking to make the conference finals for the third straight year, and also looking for their first Finals berth since 1993. The Spurs on the other hand, were looking for their third trip in five years, and their fourth NBA title overall. The series received international interest with a playoff-record of 12 players originating outside the US. When the series ended, it had become one of the most hotly contested and controversial series in recent NBA history.

The Suns had their home court advantage quickly taken away as the Spurs took a tight Game 1, a game that saw Nash missing the final minutes for Phoenix due to a gash to his nose, which bled profusely. Nash and the Suns recovered to take Game 2 but after the game, Suns forward Amar'e Stoudemire accused the Spurs, especially Bruce Bowen and Manu Ginóbili, of being a dirty team. Despite the added scrutiny by the media circles, the Spurs won Game 3. The Suns, trying to overcome their recent failures against Texas teams in the playoffs (the Spurs and the Mavericks both defeated them in the Conference Finals), willed themselves to a come-from-behind victory in Game 4 to tie the series at 2.

However, the celebration was short-lived. In the closing minute of Game 4, with the Suns up 3, Nash brought up the ball and was shoved into the press table by Robert Horry, creating a momentary ruckus, wherein Raja Bell received a technical. As this took place, Stoudemire and Boris Diaw left the Suns bench. Although they were not involved in the altercation, they broke an established NBA rule that prohibits players from leaving the bench during an altercation. As a result, the NBA suspended Stoudemire and Diaw for one game, while Horry received a two-game suspension for the flagrant foul and ejection. Severely undermanned, the Suns came into Game 5 with the task of beating the Spurs without their star big man.

Although the Suns were able to control most of the game without the suspended players, even taking a 16-point lead on the Spurs at one point, the Spurs came back to win an incredibly close Game 5. Diaw and Stoudemire did return for the Suns in Game 6, though that didn't help the Suns to force a Game 7 and the Spurs eliminated them to advance to the Western Conference Finals with a 114–106 win.

(4) Utah Jazz vs. (8) Golden State Warriors 

This was the third playoff meeting between these two teams, with the Warriors winning the first two meetings.

Fresh off their stunning upset of the top-seeded Dallas Mavericks, the Golden State Warriors faced a very different team in Utah. The Warriors continued the frantic style of play they exhibited against the Mavericks, but the Jazz, a more defensive-minded team, managed to shut them down to take Game 1. The Warriors tried to bounce back in Game 2, and took the Jazz to overtime. But the Jazz were able to prevail, due to the inspired clutch play of guard Derek Fisher, who arrived at halftime after being with his family in New York City because of his daughter's emergency eye cancer surgery.

The series shifted back to Oakland and the raucous Oracle Arena crowd, which lifted the Warriors to a resounding blowout in Game 3, a game which saw the Warriors hit a playoff record 11 threes in the first half. However, the Jazz shrugged off the crowd and handed the Warriors their only playoff home loss of the year in Game 4. The Warriors' playoff run ended as the Jazz finished them off in Game 5. The Jazz advanced to the Western Conference Finals for the first time since 1998.

Conference finals

Eastern Conference finals

(1) Detroit Pistons vs. (2) Cleveland Cavaliers

This was the second playoff meeting between these two teams, with the Pistons winning the first meeting.

In a rematch of the thrilling 2006 second-round series, the Pistons and Cavaliers matched up in perhaps one of the most closely contested series in NBA history, with the first five games being decided by six points or less. The spotlight fell on LeBron James. Despite gaining some momentum in the opening games of the series against the experienced Pistons, key last-second decisions by James led to Cleveland losses in Games 1 and 2 in Detroit, by identical scores, in which Cleveland led for most of the two games. They faced a 0–2 deficit for the second straight year, but would easily remember from the year before that they could win three straight games to get back into the series.

With media circles on his back for his complacency in these games (James had a then playoff career low 10 points in Game 1), James came back to will the Cavs to close victories in Games 3 and 4 in Cleveland, evening the series at 2. The series shifted back to Detroit for a Game 5 that proved to be one of the most memorable postseason games in recent NBA history. In a match that went into double overtime, the Cavaliers stunned the Pistons on their home court, thanks to LeBron James' playoff career-high 48-point performance. James scored the Cavaliers' final 25 points, including all 18 points in overtime, forced the second OT with a driving dunk and made a driving layup with 2.2 seconds left in the second OT to silence the Palace crowd. A game tying buzzer beater by Chauncey Billups rimmed out making it two straight 2-point wins at the Palace in Game 5.

The Cavaliers took advantage of their home court in 2007 and exploded in Game 6 to close out the Pistons, and to clinch the franchise's first trip to the NBA Finals. Rookie Daniel Gibson scored a career-high 31 points, including five 3-pointers, to lift the Cavs in the second half behind a roaring home crowd.

Western Conference finals

(3) San Antonio Spurs vs. (4) Utah Jazz

This was the fourth playoff meeting between these two teams, with the Jazz winning the first three meetings.

For the first time since 1990, neither the #1 nor #2 seed participated in the Western Conference Finals. However, the series pitted youth against experience as the up-and-coming Utah Jazz faced off against the seasoned San Antonio Spurs. Coming into the series, the Jazz were not given much of a chance due to their inexperience. However, Carlos Boozer, Deron Williams and the Jazz were able to hold their own against San Antonio for a good part of the series.

Unfortunately, it was not enough. The series' first 2 games – both San Antonio home victories – saw the Spurs blow big first-half leads and the Jazz mount last-gasp rallies that were thwarted by San Antonio's clutch shooting. When the Spurs' 19-point first-half lead dwindled to 95-87 late in the fourth quarter of Game 1, Tim Duncan, Tony Parker, Manu Ginóbili came through with timely shots down the stretch. When San Antonio's 22-point edge shrank to 83-76 late in Game 2, Bruce Bowen broke Utah's rhythm with a 3 from the left corner and another from the right to end the threat.

The Jazz, who were undefeated at home in the postseason coming into the series, had their most cohesive effort in a 109-83 Game 3 rout. Utah pestered Duncan into early foul trouble and got baskets from players other than Williams and Boozer, who had combined for 57.7% of their team's points through the first two games. But Jazz fans' euphoria over the team's only series victory gave way to frustration in Game 4 – with most of it aimed at Ginóbili and his flopping. 11 of his 16 fourth-quarter points came at the foul line in an ugly overall team performance in which the Spurs made more free throws (30) than field goals (28). Contributing to that discrepancy were four technical fouls called against Utah in the fourth. The subsequent ejections of Utah head coach Jerry Sloan and Jazz guard Derek Fisher had a charged-up EnergySolutions Arena crowd raining debris onto the court in protest.

The unflappable Spurs responded with yet another commanding start in Game 5. They outscored the Jazz by 19 in the first quarter and led by as many as 29. Not even another late-game arrival of Fisher (from New York again) could help the Jazz enough and the Spurs won a 109–84 series-clinching victory and an eventual date in the NBA Finals with the Cavaliers.

NBA Finals: (W3) San Antonio Spurs vs. (E2) Cleveland Cavaliers

This was the first playoff meeting between the Cavaliers and the Spurs.

The Cavaliers, led by superstar LeBron James, entered the 2007 Finals looking for their first franchise championship, as well as the first championship for a pro team based out of Cleveland since the Cleveland Browns won the 1964 National Football League Championship. However, the Cavs were considered heavy underdogs against the 3-time champion Spurs. The Spurs' veteran leadership and championship experience overwhelmed the Cavs, who were swept by the Spurs after two blowouts in San Antonio and two close games in Cleveland.

Broadcasters

Eastern Conference first round

National television

Local television

Local radio

Western Conference first round

Eastern Conference semifinals

National television

Local television

National radio

Local radio

Eastern Conference finals

Western Conference finals

NBA Finals

Notes

External links
 Official website of the 2007 NBA Playoffs
 ESPN's NBA page

National Basketball Association playoffs
Playoffs

fi:NBA-kausi 2006–2007#Pudotuspelit